Vobiscum Satanas (Latin for "May Satan Be with You") is Dark Funeral's second full-length album. Vobiscum Satanas is the first album to feature longtime vocalist and lyricist Emperor Magus Caligula, and the only one to feature guitarist Typhos and drummer Alzazmon. Only guitarist Lord Ahriman returns for this album from the lineup that appeared on the previous album.

The album was remastered and reissued on CD by Regain Records in 2007. The reissue was limited to 3,000 copies and also featured four bonus tracks recorded live at Hultsfreds Festival in 1998. The album was remastered in May 2007 by Peter In de Betou at Tailor Maid Productions.

Track listing

Personnel
 Emperor Magus Caligula – vocals, bass guitar
 Lord Ahriman – guitar
 Typhos – guitar
 Alzazmon – drums
 Peter Tägtgren – mixing

References

2001 albums
Dark Funeral albums
Albums produced by Peter Tägtgren